William John Sawrey Morritt (c. 1813 – 13 April 1874) was a British Conservative Party politician from Rokeby, which was then in Yorkshire but is now in County Durham.

He was elected as a Member of Parliament (MP) for the North Riding of Yorkshire at a by-election in March 1862, following the death of the Liberal MP Edward Stillingfleet Cayley. He held the seat until the 1865 general election, when he was defeated by the Liberal Frederick Milbank.

References

External links 
 

1810s births
1874 deaths
Conservative Party (UK) MPs for English constituencies
UK MPs 1859–1865
Politicians from Yorkshire